The State Academy of arts of Turkmenistan (Türkmenistanyň Döwlet çeperçilik akademiýasy) in Ashgabat, was founded in 1994 by President of Turkmenistan Saparmurat Niyazov. Is subordinate to the Ministry of Culture of Turkmenistan.

The new building opened February 1, 2006 in Alisher Navoi Street, near to the Museum of Fine Arts of Turkmenistan. Took part in the opening ceremony the President of Turkmenistan, Saparmurat Niyazov. The cost of the buildings built by the French company "Bouygues" - $40 million.

Currently rector of the Academy is Ahatmyrat Nuvvaev.

Departments: art and composition, graphics, sculpture, Architecture and Design, the national art, history and theory of art.

References

1994 establishments in Turkmenistan
Turkmenistan culture
Learned societies of Turkmenistan
Buildings and structures in Ashgabat
Educational institutions established in 1994
Academies of arts